Edmond Spencer Blackburn (September 22, 1868March 10, 1912) was a Republican U.S. Congressman from North Carolina between 1901 and 1903 and 1905 and 1907.

Born near Boone, North Carolina, Blackburn attended common schools and became a lawyer. He was admitted to the bar in 1890 and practiced law in Jefferson, North Carolina. A clerk for the North Carolina Senate in 1894 and 1895, he was elected to the state house in 1896 and 1897, the second year serving as speaker pro tempore.

In 1898, he was named an assistant United States attorney, and two years later, was elected as a Republican to the United States House of Representatives. He ran unsuccessfully for re-election in 1902, but was elected to a second non-consecutive term in 1904 in the 59th U.S. Congress.

Declining to run again in 1906, Blackburn returned to his law practice in Greensboro, North Carolina and died in Elizabethtown in 1912; he is buried near his hometown of Boone.

External links

1868 births
1912 deaths
People from Watauga County, North Carolina
American people of Scottish descent
Republican Party members of the United States House of Representatives from North Carolina
Republican Party members of the North Carolina House of Representatives
People from Greensboro, North Carolina
19th-century American politicians